Hyposmocoma waikamoi is a species of moth of the family Cosmopterigidae. It is endemic to Maui.

The wingspan is 10.4–11 mm for males and 9.8–9.9 mm for females.

The larvae have been reared on lichens growing on a large rock in the shade. The larvae live in a larval case which has the form of a candywrapper-shaped structure with one entrance at each end. In the wild, it is covered with bits of greyish lichen.

Etymology
The specific name is derived from the Nature Conservancy reserve on east Maui to which the species is apparently restricted.

References

waikamoi
Endemic moths of Hawaii
Moths described in 2011